Sunita Sharma may refer to:
 Sunita Sharma (cricket coach)
 Sunita Sharma (gymnast)
 Sunita Sharma (Big Brother contestant)